Christian Duguay (born January 3, 1970) is an American actor and comedian. Duguay is most notable as one of the recurring cast of sketch comedy series MADtv.

Biography

Early years
Christian Duguay was born on January 3, 1970, in Stanford, California. He grew up in Carefree, Arizona and Readfield, Maine. Duguay attended the Berklee College of Music in Boston, Massachusetts where he majored in Jazz Theory and Composition. In 1990, Duguay enrolled in the film school at California State University at Northridge, majoring in screenwriting. He performed with the improv comedy group Legitimate Freaks, and later studied at Groundlings Theater. He joined the Groundlings Main Company in 2000.

Personal life
Christian Duguay is married to Emily Maya Mills. He was formerly married to fellow Groundling Rachel Ramras.

Career

MADtv
Duguay joined the cast of MADtv in 2000. He soon found popularity for his celebrity impressions which included: Jay Leno and *NSYNC's Joey Fatone, and most notably George W. Bush.

Characters

Impressions
 Adolf Hitler
 Andy Griffith
 Bob Eubanks
 Colin Quinn
 Dan Rather
 George W. Bush
 Howie Long
 Jay Leno
 Pitbull Patterson
 Jim Backus
 John McDaniel
 Joey Fatone
 Martin Sheen
 Robert Zemeckis
 Wolf Blitzer

Television projects
Aside from MADtv, Duguay has made other television appearances on shows like Arrested Development and Yes, Dear. Duguay also appeared in the HBO special Sketch Pad. As of March 2006, he is still with the Main Company of the Groundlings.

Filmography

Television appearances

External links
 
 Christian Duguay's Instagram

American impressionists (entertainers)
American male television actors
Male actors from California
1970 births
People from Stanford, California
Living people
Male actors from Maine
American sketch comedians
People from Readfield, Maine
Comedians from California
People from Carefree, Arizona
21st-century American comedians